Tabidia candidalis is a moth in the family Crambidae. It is found in China (Zhejiang, Guangdong) and India.

The wingspan is 15–18 mm. The forewings are white, the basal area tinged with greyish-fuscous. The antemedial line is blackish the outer margin with a black blotch along the upper half. The discoidal stigma is black, the postmedial line is fuscous and is followed on the costa by a large black blotch. The lower third of the median area is fulvous with a round blackish apical spot. The hindwings are white, but the outer third is blackish.

References

Moths described in 1896
Spilomelinae